DOS 386 or DOS/386 may refer to:

Concurrent DOS 386, a Digital Research CP/M- and DOS-compatible multiuser multitasking operating system variant since 1987
FlexOS 386, a Digital Research FlexOS operating system variant since 1987
PC-MOS/386, a DOS-compatible multiuser, multitasking operating system produced by The Software Link since 1987

See also
DOS 3 (disambiguation)
DOS 286 (disambiguation)
DOS (disambiguation)
DOS/360